Florence Seyvos (born 1967 in Lyon) is a French novelist, and screenwriter. Her films have been successful in French and in English.

Life
Seyvos was born in Lyon in 1967 and lived in northern France. Seyvos published her first book for children after winning first prize in a short story competition. She has also written novels including Les Apparitions which was awarded the Prix Goncourt du premier roman) and Un Garçon Incassable.

Seyvos collaborates on many of her screenplays with Noémie Lvovsky, including Sentiments (no) and Camille Redouble.

She has lived in the Ardennes, in Ivory Coast, Le Havre and Paris.

Awards
1987 Lauréate du PJE
1995 Prix Goncourt First Novel
 Prix France Télévision

Works
Gratia, Éditions de l'Olivier, 1992, 
Les Apparitions, Éditions de l'Olivier, 1995, 
L'Abandon, Éditions de l'Olivier, 2002,

Young adult
Nanouk et moi, L'Ecole des Loisirs, 2010, 
L'Ami du Petit Tyrannosaure, l'École des loisirs, 2005, 
Pochee, l'École des loisirs, 1998,

Filmography
1997 Les années lycée: Petites  (TV)
1999 Life Doesn't Scare Me
2003 Feelings
2007 Faut que ça danse!

References

External links
"Florence Seyvos", France Culture

1967 births
French novelists
Mass media people from Lyon
Prix Goncourt du Premier Roman recipients
Living people
French screenwriters